American language(s) may refer to:

Indigenous languages of the Americas, languages spoken by indigenous peoples from North America and South America
Languages of North America, indigenous, (former) colonial, and immigrant languages spoken in North America
Languages of the United States, numerous languages spoken in the US
Languages of South America, indigenous, (former) colonial, and immigrant languages spoken in South America
The American Language, a 1919 book

See also
American Sign Language, the sign language of deaf communities in the US and English-speaking parts of Canada
American English